In television electronics, A-MAC carries digital information: sound, and data-teletext on an FM subcarrier at 7 MHz. Since the vision bandwidth of a standard MAC signal is 8.4 MHz, the horizontal resolution on A-MAC has to be reduced to make room for the 7 MHz carrier. A-MAC has not been used in service.

Technical details 
MAC transmits luminance and chrominance data separately in time rather than separately in frequency (as other analog television formats do, such as composite video).

Audio and Scrambling (selective access)
 Audio, in a format similar to NICAM was transmitted digitally rather than as an FM subcarrier.
 The MAC standard included a standard scrambling system, EuroCrypt, a precursor to the standard DVB-CSA encryption system.

TV transmission systems
 Analog high-definition television systems
 PAL, what MAC technology tried to replace
 SECAM, what MAC technology tried to replace
 A-MAC
 B-MAC 
 C-MAC  
 D-MAC
 E-MAC
 S-MAC
 D2-MAC 
 HD-MAC, an early high-definition television standard allowing for 2048x1152 resolution.
 DVB-S, MAC technology was replaced by this standard
 DVB-T, MAC technology was replaced by this standard

External links
 Multiplexed Analogue Components in "Analog TV Broadcast Systems" by Paul Schlyter

Video formats
Television technology